The Bishop of Huntingdon is an episcopal title used by a suffragan bishop of the Church of England Diocese of Ely, in the Province of Canterbury, England. The title takes its name after Huntingdon, the historic county town of Huntingdonshire, England.

List of Bishops of Huntingdon

References

External links
 Crockford's Clerical Directory - Listings

Bishops of Huntingdon
Anglican suffragan bishops in the Diocese of Ely